Amity is an unincorporated community in Amwell Township, Washington County, Pennsylvania, United States.  It is home to the Bailey Covered Bridge and Hughes Covered Bridge.

History
Amity was laid out in 1797, and named after the local Amity Presbyterian Church.

References

Unincorporated communities in Washington County, Pennsylvania
Unincorporated communities in Pennsylvania